Ludancun station is a Metro station of Shenzhen Metro Line 9. It opened on 28 October 2016. This station is located under the green belt on the west of the intersection of Binhe Boulevard and Bao'an South Road.

Station layout

Exits

References

External links
 Shenzhen Metro Ludancun Station (Chinese)
 Shenzhen Metro Ludancun Station (English)

Shenzhen Metro stations
Railway stations in Guangdong
Luohu District
Railway stations in China opened in 2016